Isolog Schools is a private owned institution with a main campus in Akute, Ogun State and another in Ojodu, Lagos State, southern Nigeria.

History
The development of the Isolog Educational group came as a direct result of the recognition of the increasingly deteriorating education standards and the poor delivery of education services in the country. Seeing the gap between the expectation of parents and the reality of the education system, the directors of Isolog Nigeria Limited started a project to deliver affordable education to the youth of Nigeria.

The group began operations by setting up a vocational and secretarial school – Isolog Computer and Secretarial Institute (ICSI) – in 1998 to provide training for postsecondary school leavers wishing to go into self- or paid employment. The number of students in programmes at ICSI at the inception was in excess of 450.

In 1999, Isolog College, a secondary school institution offering courses in science, arts and commercial subjects for classes JS 1 to SS 3 was established. The population of students in the first two years of inception was over 300. The group expanded its operation in October 2000 by the founding of Isolog Nursery/Primary School at Ojodu to educate kindergarten age children. Many pupils were admitted to the school in the 2000/2001 academic session. The group expanded with two schools at Akute, Ogun State in the suburbs of Lagos. The Isolog College campus, a boarding school, was founded in October 2005; the Isolog Junior School was established in October 2006.

Schools

Isolog College, Ojodu
Isolog College Ojodu was founded in September 1999. The college is located at 5/7 Adegoke Ajayi Street, off Saabo, Ojodu.
It is a coeducational post-primary institution that offers courses in science, arts and commercial subjects that cover the NECO and WAEC syllabi for SSCE/GCE O/Level.

Isolog College Campus, Akute
The college campus Akute was founded in October 2005 to cater for students requiring boarding. The college is situated on 1 acres of land at 25/27 Aranse Oluwa Street, Temidire Estate, Akute. It is a coeducational institution that offers courses in science, arts and commercial subjects, both at SSCE/OL and A/L. The college admits students for day and boarding. A/L, O/L and IGCSE Cambridge programmes are offered at Isolog College for students who desire direct admission into Nigerian, British, European and American universities.

Enrollment
The average student enrolment is in hundreds.

Isolog Nursery and Primary School
Isolog Nursery and Primary School, Ojodu was founded in October 2000. The school is located at 1/3 Morgan Street, Ojodu. The average pupils enrolment is in hundreds. The Isolog Nursery and Primary School at Ojodu is coeducational. The school admits pupils to the crèche, reception, kindergarten {KG}, nursery {preparatory}, and primary {Basics 1–6} classes. The school runs the primary school education curriculum of the Ministry of Education.

Isolog Junior School, Akute
The school is coeducational. It admits pupils to the Crèche, Reception, Kindergarten {KG}, Nursery {Preparatory}, and Primary {Basics 1–6} classes. The enrolment in hundreds. The school has the capacity for 800 pupils.

Multipurpose Event Hall – 'Rachel's Place'

A multipurpose School Hall fitted with latest gadgets, furniture and accessories is built on a 2100m2 of land at 97, Alagbole-Akute Road, Akute, directly adjacent to Isolog Junior School, Ajayi Farm Bustop. The multipurpose hall is to serve the entire Isolog Group for all events and activities. The hall is known as Rachel's Place.

Curriculum
The two colleges offer courses at Junior and Senior levels that cover NECO and WAEC syllabi for SSCE/GCE O/L. There are also curricular for Advanced Level/Higher School Certificate {HSC}, SAT, GMAT. The Cambridge A/L, IGCSE and O/L GCE are at Isolog College Campus. Students prepare for the Cambridge University Examinations in June and November. The Cambridge A/L, IGCSE and O.L GCE are in September for exams in June.

Tenth anniversary
The Chairman/CEO of the group of schools is Engr Isaac Ogunidipe. and vice chairperson/Proprietor is Mrs Rachel Ogundipe. Celebrations were held at Isolog Junior School, Akute, Ogun State for the tenth anniversary. A long-service award/gala night was held to cap the one-week of activities which featured a rally, public lecture, cultural display, football matches, drama, inter-school debates and a thanksgiving service.

Outstanding Academic Performance

The two colleges in the group continue to excel in academic performance every year. In 2015 academic session, the two colleges emerged the schools with the best results in the NECO and WAEC SSC Examinations in Lagos and Ogun States.

In Lagos State; Isolog College Ojodu emerged with the best overall results in both NECO and WAEC SSC Examinations in Lagos State. The School also emerged with overall second best result in NECO SSCE in Nigeria. The School was also the best in the PZ's Chemistry Competition in Lagos State.

Similarly, in Ogun State; Isolog College Akute emerged the School with the overall best result in NECO SSC Examination in Ogun State in 2015 academic session and in the 2016 Session for the second year running.

Isolog Group is known for its tough stance on Examination malpractice and academic fraud. Any form of Examination Fraud carries instant expulsion and prosecution.

References

External links
Isolog Schools
Official Facebook
Official Twitter 

Education in Lagos
Educational institutions established in 1998
1998 establishments in Nigeria
Schools in Lagos